The Alfa Romeo Romeo was a light commercial, cabover van and pickup truck that was introduced by the Italian automaker Alfa Romeo in 1954 as the Alfa Romeo Autotutto  ("all purpose"). The line of vans continued to be built until 1983, when it was replaced by relabelled Fiat and Iveco commercials.



Romeo 

The first Alfa Romeo T10 "Autotutto"  ("all purpose")  was unveiled at the 1954 Turin Motor Show in panel and minibus versions. Later, more versions became available as Alfa Romeo introduced numerous body versions: van, high-roof van, "Promiscuo" (van with additional side windows and rear seating), minibus, school bus, ambulance, pickup, drop-side truck and double-cab truck. In addition, coachbuilding companies made their own versions. 

This engine was later used on the Giulietta Berlina. The optional two-cylinder, supercharged diesel engine had .

Romeo 2 

The updated Romeo 2 version was introduced in 1957/ It was assembled in Italy and also built under license in Spain by FADISA (Fabricacion de Automoviles Diesel S.A.). The Spanish version had a 1.6-liter Perkins
4/99 diesel engine and a gearbox with synchro on all forward gears.

Romeo 3 

The final version, the Romeo 3, was introduced in 1966. The Romeo 3 had various improvements, including a hydraulic clutch and adjustable driver's seat. It had a short production run of around six months before being replaced by the Giulia 1300 engined F12 and A12 models. In all, some 23,000 Romeos were produced between 1954 and 1966.

F12/A12 and F11/A11 

In 1967, the Autotutto was replaced with the Giulia-engined Alfa Romeo F12 and A12 vans. The front-engined van had a four-speed gearbox and front-wheel drive. 

This engine was also available in the Giulia sedan from 1976. The front brakes were discs and rear ones drums. Abandoning the use of a model name, "F" depicted a furgone, or van, "A" depicted an autocarro or light truck, and "12" indicated the carrying capacity of 12 quintali (1 quintale = ).

In 1967, Motor Ibérica took over FADISA, the company that made Ebro trucks and merged the companies products. The Alfa Romeo F12 was renamed the Ebro F-100 in Spain and, after its facelift, was sold as the F-108. In 1987, Nissan Motors took control of Motor Ibérica and Ebro Trucks and started producing the Nissan Trade as a replacement, although it was based on the same chassis. These continued to be made until the beginning of the 2000s at the Ávila plant in Spain.

Between 1967 and 1971, light, A11 and F11 versions were also available. These has a lighter payload and a lower horsepower rating. All Alfa Romeo vans were facelifted in 1977 with a new black plastic radiator grill, and chrome badging was replaced with black adhesive stickers. Production stopped in 1983, by when the total production of A11, A12, F11, and F12 vans was around 17,300 units.

Replacement 

Some Fiat and Iveco models were also marketed as Alfa Romeos as replacements for Romeo Romeo vans. The AR8 was based on the first-generation Iveco Daily, and the AR6 was a rebadged first-generation Fiat Ducato. They both carried Alfa Romeo's traditional shield-shaped grille.

References 

Romeo
Vans
Minibuses
Cab over vehicles
Pickup trucks
Front-wheel-drive vehicles
1950s cars
1960s cars
1970s cars
1980s cars
Vehicles introduced in 1954